HK Dinaburga are a professional Latvian ice hockey team that plays in the Optibet Hockey League, the top tier of the sport in Latvia. The team is based in Daugavpils and play their home games at the Daugavpils Ice Arena.

History
The team was founded in 2013, initially playing under the name of the city in which they're located; Daugavpils. The previous team in the city, DHK Latgale, folded at the culmination of the 2011-12 season. They began play in the Latvian Hockey League, the top tier of hockey in Latvia, during the 2013-14 season, however, they performed poorly winning only one game. Following this, the team dropped down a league to the newly formed Latvian 1st Division where they remained until 2019. Daugavpils would find more success in the second tier of Latvian hockey, winning the league in 2016, and finishing top of the table in the regular season in both 2017 and 2019. Following the culmination of the 2019 Daugavpils changed their name to HK Dinaburga, taking the moniker of a nearby castle, and rejoined the Latvian Hockey League, now known as the Optibet Hockey League for sponsorship reasons. In their first season back in the top tier, Dinaburga were in 6th place out of 8 teams before the play-offs were cancelled due to the COVID-19 pandemic.

Roster 
Updated February 11, 2021.

Season-by-season record
Note: GP = Games played, W = Wins, L = Losses, T = Ties, OTL = Overtime losses, Pts = Points, GF = Goals for, GA = Goals against, PIM = Penalties in minutes

Team records

Career
These are the top five scorers in HK Dinaburga history.

''Note: Pos = Position; GP = Games played; G = Goals; A = Assists; Pts = Points

Penalty minutes: Maris Lescovs, 182

Season

Regular season 
 Most goals in a season: Artūrs Kuzmenkovs, 35 (2018-19)
 Most assists in a season: Artūrs Kuzmenkovs, 66 (2018-19)
 Most points in a season: Artūrs Kuzmenkovs, 101 (2018-19)
 Most penalty minutes in a season: Maris Lescovs, 86 (2019–20)

Playoffs 
 Most goals in a playoff season: Daniil Kulikov, 10 (2015–16)
 Most assists in a playoff season: Daniil Kulikov, 12 (2015–16)
 Most points in a playoff season: Daniil Kulikov, 22 (2015–16)
 Most penalty minutes in a playoff season: Artūrs Kuzmenkovs, 36 (2018-19)

References

External links
 

Ice hockey clubs established in 2013
Latvian Hockey League teams
2013 establishments in Latvia
Sport in Daugavpils 
Ice hockey teams in Latvia